Deborah Marquit  is an American fashion designer and an eponymous brand and is notable for being the first designer to create women's bras and underwear in fluorescent neon colors in 1984. This invention earned her first sale to seventeen Bloomingdale's stores, that launched her brand across the USA.

Deborah Marquit was inducted into the (CFDA) Council of Fashion Designers of America in 2009.

References

American fashion designers
American women fashion designers
Living people
Year of birth missing (living people)
21st-century American women